The Citizens' Declaration is a declaration issued by an array of Malaysian political leaders past and present including former foes stood together on 4 March 2016 to demand Prime Minister Najib Razak's resignation from office, at a press conference chaired by former Prime Minister Mahathir Mohamad. 

Coming amidst the 1Malaysia Development Berhad scandal, the declaration also saw Malaysia's two biggest political arch-rivals, Anwar Ibrahim and Mahathir Mohamad, work together for people's rights. Besides demanding that Najib be removed from his position, the declaration signed by, among others, former Premier Mahathir and 57 other signatories also touched on freedom of speech and a free media.

Content 
The main points of the declaration were:
The removal of Najib Razak as the prime minister of Malaysia through non-violent and legally permissible means;
The removal of all those who have acted in concert with him;
A repeal of all recent laws and agreements that violate the fundamental rights guaranteed by the Federal Constitution, and;
A restoration of the integrity of the institutions that have been undermined, such as the Royal Malaysia Police (RMP), the Malaysian Anti-Corruption Commission (MACC), Bank Negara Malaysia (BNM) and the Public Accounts Committee (PAC).

The declaration included several key reasons for the demands:
Concern over the deteriorating political, economic and social situation in the country;
Damage done to the country under the premiership of Najib Razak;
 Malaysia becoming one of the 10 most corrupt countries in the world, according to Ernst and Young in their Asia Pacific Fraud Survey Report Series 2013. The 2015 Corruption Perception Index showed Malaysia had dropped four places from 50 to 54; and,
 Allocations to all ministries and public institutions, including universities, have been reduced because of shortage of funds. Even when allocations are budgeted for, no money was available.

Signatories
 Mahathir Mohamad –  Former Prime Minister of Malaysia
 Lim Kit Siang – DAP Supremo and Gelang Patah MP 
 Azmin Ali – Selangor Chief Minister and Deputy President of PKR 
 Mukhriz Mahathir – Former Chief Minister of Kedah 
 Muhyiddin Yassin - Former Deputy Prime Minister of Malaysia
 Syed Saddiq Syed Abdul Rahman – Malaysian Asia Award Winning Best Debater 
 Zaid Ibrahim – Former Law Minister 
 Ling Liong Sik – Former MCA President
 Mahfuz Omar – PAS Lawmaker and Pokok Sena MP
 Maria Chin Abdullah – BERSIH Chairman 
 Nurul Izzah Anwar – PKR Vice President and Lembah Pantai MP 
 Mohamad Sabu – President of Party AMANAH Negara
 Salahuddin Ayub – Parti Amanah Negara (Amanah) Deputy President
 Ambiga Sreenevasan – Former Bar Council Chairperson 
 Rafizi Ramli – PKR Vice President and Pandan MP 
 Kamaruddin Jaafar - PKR Tumpat MP
 Tian Chua - PKR Vice-President
 Muhammad Muhammad Taib - Former Selangor Menteri Besar 
 Anthony Loke - DAP Organising Secretary
 Teresa Kok - DAP lawmaker and Seputeh MP
 Hishamuddin Rais - Political Activist
 Datuk Mujahid Yusof Rawa - Party AMANAH Negara Vice-President 
 Tok Muda Dato Wan Abu Bakar Wan Mohamed - Former Deputy Defence Minister/ Former UMNO Supreme Council Member
 Datuk Hamidah Osman and Anina Saadudin - Former Umno leader

Observers
 Datuk Mustafa Ali - PAS Election Director
 Khairuddin Razali – PAS Ulama Council Information Chief

Full Text of Citizens' Declaration

See also 
 1Malaysia Development Berhad scandal
 Corruption in Malaysia
 Najib Razak's controversies

References

Protests in Malaysia
Civil rights protests
Electoral reform in Malaysia
2016 in Malaysian politics
2016 documents
Democracy movements